Agia Triada is a neighbourhood in the city of Patras, Achaea, Greece.

References

Neighborhoods in Patras